Assaf Khalifa (born 1968) is a Syrian former footballer who played as a forward.

Club career
Khalifa was the first foreign player from outside the former USSR in the Russian Football Premier League when he joined FC Zhemchuzhina Sochi in 1994.

Managerial career
After retirement as a player, he went to coaching in Syria: Al-Nidal SC and Al-Wahda SC, Lebanon: Al-Mabarrah, Salam Zgharta and Al Nabi Sheet, Jordan: That Ras Club, and Oman: Oman Club.

Honours
Individual
 Lebanese Premier League top goalscorer: 1995–96

References

1968 births
Living people
Syrian footballers
Al-Wahda SC (Syria) players
CS Sfaxien players
FC Zhemchuzhina Sochi players
Syrian expatriate footballers
Expatriate footballers in Russia
Syrian expatriate sportspeople in Russia
Russian Premier League players
Nejmeh SC players
Expatriate footballers in Lebanon
Syrian expatriate sportspeople in Lebanon
Association football forwards
Expatriate football managers in Jordan
Syrian expatriate sportspeople in Jordan
Expatriate football managers in Lebanon
Expatriate football managers in Oman
Syrian expatriate sportspeople in Oman
Syrian football managers
Al-Wahda SC (Syria) managers
Lebanese Premier League players
Syrian Premier League players
Lebanese Premier League managers
Al Mabarra FC managers
Salam Zgharta FC managers
Al Nabi Chit SC managers
Lebanese Premier League top scorers